Peabody High School is a public high school in Trenton, Tennessee, operated by the Trenton Special School District for grades 9–12.  The school mascot is The Golden Tide and school colors are black and gold.  The Trenton campus of Dyersburg State Community College is adjacent to the Peabody campus.  This allows Peabody students an opportunity to obtain college credit by taking courses at Dyersburg State while attending high school.

History
Peabody High School was established in 1877 with funds provided by philanthropist George Peabody. The first school building was constructed on the former site of Andrew College, which had been purchased by the school directors two years earlier.

A new school building was built in 1917 and remained in use until 1980, when it was replaced by a modern building on a new site. The old Peabody High School building on South College Street was converted for residential use. It was listed on the National Register of Historic Places in 1984.

References

External links
 Peabody High School

Buildings and structures in Gibson County, Tennessee
Neoclassical architecture in Tennessee
Education in Gibson County, Tennessee
Public high schools in Tennessee
School buildings on the National Register of Historic Places in Tennessee
National Register of Historic Places in Gibson County, Tennessee
1877 establishments in Tennessee